The Citizens Foundation is a non-profit organization based in Reykjavík, Iceland and founded under Icelandic law. Its purpose is to promote electronic collaborative democracy around the globe and to develop the software needed for that purpose.

Its formation can be traced back to the Icelandic financial crash in 2008 when development of the software started although the Foundation itself wasn't formally founded until 2010. The main focus has been on developing a web based democracy tool called Open Active Democracy (OAD) which it uses for its democracy building projects which are: Better Reykjavík, Shadow Parliament (Iceland only) and the international project Your Priorities.

Projects
Shadow Parliament (Skuggaþing) opened formally in February 2010, imports all proposals from the Icelandic Parliament (Alþingi) and enables citizens to choose which proposals they support or oppose as well as allowing them to put forward their own proposals. The system received acclaim from the Icelandic blogosphere and over 2,000 citizens took part in using the system, including members of the Parliament. It has however not been used in any formal way by the Icelandic Parliament.

A few months later, on 25 May 2010, the website Shadow City (Skuggaborg) opened, a few days before the municipal elections in Icelands capital, Reykjavík with all parties running in the election given their own section for promotion and usage. The website was received with acclaim by the Best Party whose supporters used it extensively for their proposals and ideas. The Best Party won the elections and started majority negotiations with the Social Democratic Alliance. The parties asked the founders of Skuggaborg to create a special area on the website called Better Reykjavík  for the citizens to help them create a majority agreement. In 3 days the number of users had reached almost 3.000 with over 400 ideas and 873 points for and against those ideas. One newssite referred to this as "A flood of ideas about a Better Reykjavík". In their majority agreement the parties said: The website Better Reykjavík will be used as support in decision making and policy formulation and the city has been working with the Citizens Foundation in opening a new and improved version of Better Reykjavík that will be used as an integral part of the city's governance.

This success prompted the Young Social Democrats (the youth movement related to the Social Democratic Alliance) to challenge the government to implement a similar system for the country.

Some of the ideas from Better Reykjavík have already been put into practice, one of them is a proposal to keep one swimmingpool open 24/7 for 1–2  months in the summer. This was realized two months after the election in the biggest swimmingpool in Reykjavík, Laugardalslaugin although the pool was only open continuously for a week.

After Better Reykjavík the Citizens Foundation team, Róbert Bjarnason, Gunnar Grímsson and Óskar J. Sandholt started focusing on the Foundation's international effort, Your Priorities, which includes a website like Better Reykjavík for every country in the world, free of charge.

Open Active Democracy
The Citizens Foundation develops software called Open Active Democracy (OAD). The basic premise behind OAD is to bridge the gap between those who rule and those who are ruled, i.e. to allow the rulers to call out to the public for the priorities, arguments for and against those priorities as well as general opinions on the issues at hand. This also works in reverse; it gives its users the power to show the rulers what their priorities are.

In order to do this, the system has the priorities as its core function. Any user can add a new priority where users can support or oppose them, add their points for and against them and also rate the points’ usefulness. The outcome of this is a prioritised list of issues/ideas/proposals/priorities, both for each person and collectively.

OAD was designed to aggregate the priorities with the widest support as well as the best points for and against those priorities. It uses crowdsourcing to achieve these objectives, allowing its users to submit their own priorities as well as supporting or opposing other users’ priorities and marking points as useful or not.

In order to encourage users to participate, a Social point system is used in which users get Social points when other users find their input useful and also if those the user invited accept the invitation. Those who accept your invitation automatically follow you and you them. Users can also manually decide to follow other users although this avenue has yet to be explored fully by the developers. Users can add comments to any priority, points and also to other users’ personal spaces.

The point system is engineered to prevent arguments which make users gather their thoughts in order to make their point come through. There is a strict length limit on points in order to enable other users to quickly scan through the best points although it is possible to add links to further information. Points for and against are in their own respective columns which has the effect of stifling the classic comment arguments of Yes/No/Yes/No so common in standard website comment areas. Those futile Yes/No arguments function more like a real-life heated argument whereas the point system in OAD steers the user towards convincing other users that their own point is valid and should influence the decision.

This also has the effect of users watching their language and thinking carefully on how to best make their point come across in as few words as possible. Most of this is unconscious on the part of the users and has been proven to work very well. The system is mostly self-governing as users report abusive behaviour from other users but so far there has been little need for that as the design of the system discourages such behaviour, with very few cases of abusive behaviour having been reported.

References

External links 
 Citizens Foundation

Internship 

 It is really a great opportunity to work in The Citizens Foundation in Ranchi Head-office. It was a great experience collaborating my effort with the people working there who are very benevolent, helpful and work tirelessly day and night towards making a difference in the society and nation at large. They have dedicated their lives for the betterment of the under privileged section of our society. The organization is welcoming of anyone who wants to devote their time and energy for an internship program or full time program with the NGO. The work culture in the organization is flexible with properly scheduled timeline for each task. This results in good quality work and successful completion of projects on time.

Review by Priya Bharti

Organizations based in Iceland